The 2004 Atlantic Coast Conference baseball tournament was held at the Salem Memorial Baseball Stadium in Salem, Virginia, from May 25 through 30.  Florida State won the tournament and earned the Atlantic Coast Conference's automatic bid to the 2004 NCAA Division I baseball tournament.

Tournament
The two teams with the worst records in regular season conference play faced each other in a single elimination situation to earn the 8th spot in the conference tournament.

All-Tournament Team

(*)Denotes Unanimous Selection

See also
College World Series
NCAA Division I Baseball Championship

References

TheACC.com 2004 Baseball Championship Info

Tournament
Atlantic Coast Conference baseball tournament
Atlantic Coast Conference baseball tournament
Atlantic Coast Conference baseball tournament
Baseball competitions in Salem, Virginia
College baseball tournaments in Virginia